The 1915 Shipley by-election was held on 9 February 1915.  The by-election was held due to the death  of the incumbent Liberal MP, Percy Illingworth.  It was won by the Liberal candidate Oswald Partington, who was unopposed.  Under an agreement between the parties vacant seats were to be uncontested for the duration of the conflict, with only a candidate of the party holding the seat being nominated. Partington stood down at the next general election in 1918.

References

Shipley by-election
Shipley, West Yorkshire
By-elections to the Parliament of the United Kingdom in Bradford constituencies
Shipley by-election
Unopposed by-elections to the Parliament of the United Kingdom (need citation)
1910s in Yorkshire